Snead may refer to:

People with the surname
 Doak Snead, American musician
 Esix Snead, former American baseball player
 J. C. Snead, American golfer, nephew of Sam Snead
 John Snead, American role-playing game designer
 Kirby Snead, American baseball player
 Louise Hammond Willis Snead (1870–1958), American writer, lecturer, artist
 Norm Snead, former American football player
 Ocey Snead, American murder victim
 Sam Snead, American golfer
 Jevan Snead (1987-2019), American college football player
 Willie Snead, American football player

Places
 Snead, Powys, village, Wales, United Kingdom
 Snead, Alabama, town, United States
 Snead, Georgia, unincorporated community, United States

See also
 Angus Snead Macdonald (1883-1961), American businessman
 Snead State Community College, Alabama, United States
 Sneed (disambiguation)